Kind Campaign, founded in 2009, is a non-profit organization and school program that brings awareness and healing to the negative and lasting effects of girl-against-girl bullying. The organization's founder, Lauren Parsekian, directed and produced a documentary film, Finding Kind, focusing on the subject.

History 
Kind Campaign started in Malibu, California, as an after-product of an idea for a documentary film. The founders of Kind Campaign studied at Pepperdine University, where they majored in documentary film and telecommunications.

The idea of creating a non-profit organization and movement stemmed from an overwhelming demand of females that need a resource of comfort and insight.  Kind Campaign received the Lilly Endowment grant in February 2009 for "Service and Social Action".

In 2011, the Kind Campaign was featured on a special episode of Monster High, a doll line for girls.

As of Fall 2015, the founders, Lauren Paul and Molly Thompson, have personally spoken in over 300 schools across North America.  October 2015 will mark their tenth national tour across North America for National Anti-Bullying Month.  The documentary film, Finding Kind, screens in schools and communities almost every day of the school year.

In 2016, Kohl's launched a girls & juniors line in partnership with the Kind Campaign. The most notable item of the line is a tee shirt stating, "You can sit with us."

Methods 
Kind Campaign uses a number of highly visible methods to reach out to the general public, promote its message, encourage action and raise funds.

Kind Campaign is a largely Internet-based campaign and therefore has multiple online communities throughout cyberspace. Kind Campaign can be found on Orkut, Twitter, Bebo, and temporarily uses Facebook or its website for its campus organizing.

References

External links
 Kind Campaign

Non-profit organizations based in California
Organizations established in 2009
2009 establishments in California
Anti-bullying organizations in the United States